A constitutional referendum was held in Tajikistan on 6 November 1994. The new constitution was approved by 96% of voters.

Results

References

1994
1994 referendums
1994 in Tajikistan
Constitutional referendums